The Öko-Institut (Institute for Applied Ecology) (sometimes spelled Oeko-Institut) is a non-profit, private-sector environmental research institute with its head office in Freiburg im Breisgau, Germany.

It emerged from the anti-nuclear movement in 1977 and today has over 170 employees at its sites in Freiburg, Darmstadt and Berlin. The institute is organized as an association and pursues the goals of promoting environmental protection and sustainable development, which is to be achieved, among other things, through scientific research, consulting and educating the public. The supporting association has about 2,000 members, including nearly 20 municipalities. It finances its work primarily through third-party funding for projects. In addition, there are membership fees and donations. Revenues in 2019 amounted to 15.7 million euros.

References

External links 
 Official website

Climate change organizations
Energy policy
Environmental organisations based in Germany
Freiburg im Breisgau
Renewable energy organizations
Sustainability organizations